Wang Yuwen or Wang Yu-wen may refer to:

Wang Yu-wen (Taiwanese actress) (王渝文; born 1971)
Wang Yuwen (Chinese actress) (王玉雯; born 1997)